Nakisanze Segawa is a Ugandan poet and storyteller. She is the author of the 2016 novel The Triangle. She took third place in the 2010 Beverley Nambozo Poetry Award for her poem "The hustler". She was a participant in the Ebedi International Residency in Iseyin, Nigeria, in January 2015.

Writing
Nakisanze Segawa is a performance poet who recites her poems in Luganda and English. Her work has been published in a number of anthologies. Her novel The Triangle was published in 2016.

Published works

Novels

Poems
"Zibogola!" and "The hustler", in 
"I love school", in 
"African sun" and "Jump", in

Stories
 "Walking the Familiar Path", in 
 "JJ", in 
"Luweero Triangle" in Jalada (2015)

References

External links
"Summoning the Rains: African women on patriarchy"
"EDITING"
"A Thousand Voices Rising and Spoken word vs Written form"
 Abubaker Mayemba, "Nambozo, a public speaker promoting poetry", The Observer (Uganda), 26 November 2017.

21st-century short story writers
21st-century Ugandan poets
21st-century Ugandan women writers
Kumusha
Living people
Ugandan short story writers
Ugandan women poets
Ugandan women short story writers
Year of birth missing (living people)